Irina Müller (later Weiße, born 10 October 1951) is a German rower, who won the gold medal at the 1976 Summer Olympics and was a member of the SG Dynamo Potsdam.

Müller was born in Leipzig; sources vary whether the birth year was 1950 or 1951.

Immediately after the 1976 Summer Olympics, she married fellow rower Stefan Weiße. As Irina Weiße, she was awarded a Patriotic Order of Merit in silver in September 1976. She was an informer for the Stasi under the codename "Ines".

References

External links
 Irina Müller dataOlympics profile

1951 births
Living people
Sportspeople from Leipzig
East German female rowers
Olympic rowers of East Germany
Rowers at the 1976 Summer Olympics
Olympic gold medalists for East Germany
Olympic medalists in rowing
World Rowing Championships medalists for East Germany
Medalists at the 1976 Summer Olympics
Recipients of the Patriotic Order of Merit in silver
People of the Stasi
East German women
European Rowing Championships medalists